This is a list of United Nations Security Council Resolutions 2601 to 2700 adopted between 29 October 2021 to present day.

See also 
 Lists of United Nations Security Council resolutions
 List of United Nations Security Council Resolutions 2501 to 2600

2601